Spitfire is the debut extended play (EP) by American electronic music producer Porter Robinson, released on September 13, 2011, as the first release by Skrillex's record label Owsla. The EP is available in CD format and digital download. It reached #1 on the iTunes Dance chart as well as the number one spot on Beatport's overall release chart, crashing Beatport's servers upon release. The EP has gained popularity with the Knife Party remix of "Unison", which has over five million YouTube views as of August 2013. The album cover pictures a Titan II GLV rocket during liftoff.

A remix EP titled Spitfire – Bonus Remixes was released as a promotional free download on Beatport on July 3, 2012, consisting of two remixes of "Vandalism" and one remix of "Spitfire".

Track listing

 Sample credits
 "100% in the Bitch" contains excerpts from "Namasensei's Japanese Lessons"
 "The State" contains excerpts from For a New Liberty by Murray N. Rothbard, as narrated by Jeff Riggenbach

Release history

Chart performance

References 

2011 debut EPs
Owsla EPs
Dubstep EPs
Electro house EPs
Moombahton EPs
Moombahcore EPs
Remix EPs
Porter Robinson albums